The 2011 South American Rugby Championship "B" was the 12th edition of the second tier competition of the leading national Rugby Union teams in South America. It was organised by Peru during August 21–27, 2011 and was won by Venezuela.

The division "B"  (o Sudamericano “B”) was contested in Lima (Perú) from 21 to 28 August 2011. Participating nations were Peru, holder, Colombia, Venezuela and Costa Rica.

The winner was Venezuela, that will meet Paraguay (last of first division) for admission to the "A" 2012 Champsionship

Standings 

{| class="wikitable"
|-
!width=165|Team
!width=40|Played
!width=40|Won
!width=40|Drawn
!width=40|Lost
!width=40|For
!width=40|Against
!width=40|Difference
!width=40|Pts
|- bgcolor=#ccffcc align=center
|align=left| 
|3||3||0||0||124||46||+ 78||9
|- align=center
|align=left| 
|3||2||0||1||91||40||+ 51||6
|- align=center
|align=left| 
|3||1||0||2||56||105||- 49||3
|- align=center
|align=left| 
|3||0||0||3||37||117||- 80||0
|}

Matches

Related Page 
 2011 South American Rugby Championship "A"

External links 
 Details
 Results

References

2011
2011 rugby union tournaments for national teams
B
rugby union
rugby union
rugby union
rugby union
International rugby union competitions hosted by Peru